James Bessen (born 1950) is an economist who has been a Lecturer at Boston University School of Law since 2004, and was previously a software developer and CEO of a software company. Bessen was also a Fellow at the Berkman Center for Internet and Society.

Bessen researches the economics of innovation, including patents and economic history. He has written about software patents with Eric Maskin, arguing that they might inhibit innovation rather than stimulate progress. With Michael J. Meurer, he wrote Patent Failure: How Judges, Bureaucrats, and Lawyers Put Innovators at Risk as well as papers on patent trolls. His book Learning by Doing: The Real Connection Between Innovation, Wages, and Wealth argues that major new technologies require new skills and knowledge that are slow and difficult to develop, affecting jobs and wages.

Bessen developed the first WYSIWYG desktop publishing program at a community newspaper in Philadelphia in 1983. He established and ran a company, Bestinfo, to sell that program commercially. In 1993, Bestinfo was sold to Intergraph.

He graduated from Harvard University.

References

External links
 

1958 births
Living people
21st-century American economists
Boston University School of Law faculty
American technology chief executives
Harvard University alumni